Raiffeisenlandesbank Niederösterreich-Wien (abbreviated RLB NÖ-Wien) is a group of organized cooperative banks in Vienna and the state of Lower Austria. It is a part of the nationwide Raiffeisen Bankengruppe grouping of independent cooperative banks, and owns a 22.6% stake in Raiffeisen Bank International (RBI). It has around 957 employees and serves around 266,000 private, business and corporate customers.

With a market share of around 42 per cent, they are the leading banking group in Lower Austria.

Ownership structure
RLB NÖ-Wien is owned by Raiffeisen-Holding Niederösterreich-Wien reg.Gen.m.b.H. (79.1 %) and the Raiffeisen banks of Lower Austria.

Principal shareholdings
 Raiffeisen Bank International AG (RBI)
 Raiffeisen Informatik GmbH (R-IT)
 Raiffeisen Immobilien Vermittlung GmbH

References

External links
 Official Website

Austrian companies established in 1983
Banks established in 1983
Companies based in Vienna
Economy of Lower Austria
Raiffeisen Zentralbank